The Maiawali, other wise known as the Mayuli, are an indigenous Australian people of the state of Queensland.

Language
The Maiawali spoke a dialect of Pitta Pitta. A number of brief records of their language were made by early European settlers in their area.

Country
Norman Tindale estimated their tribal lands as covering , taking in the areas of the Diamantina River, from Davenport Downs and the Diamantina lakes north to Old Cork, and the land from the Mayne River to Mount Vergemont. Their westerly limits were at Spring Vale. To their southeast the territory went as far as Farrars Creek. Connemara and Brighton Downs were part of Maiawali lands.

Social customs
Males were initiated into full manhood by undergoing subincision at the Mika ceremony. Hill described the technique in the following terms:
One of the elders will lie face downwards on the ground, a slight excavation having been made there to receive the stomach, the initiate is placed upon this individual's back, face up, his limbs are placed in position by various assistants, one of whom sits astride the initiate's body and holds the initiate's penis, while the actual operator makes a superficial incision through the skin from the external meatus down to near the scrotal pouch in line with the Median Raphe; a deeper incision is next made with a stone knife which opens up the canal as it is pushed onwards. Haemorrhage is prevented by the initiate squatting over some smoking embers and heated charcoal placed in a small excavation in the ground beneath him, the wound being subsequently smeared with greased and powdered charcoal. For the next two or three weeks they will always try and arrange matters so as to micturate close to or over some smoking ashes; after the operation the initiate is looked on as an adult man'

History of contact
Mary Durack, writing of the pastoral empires staked out by her grandfather Patrick Durack and John Costello in the 1870s, lists the tribal territories of the Maiawali among the  Costello took over.

Writing in 1901, Sid Hill of Brighton Downs remarked that the Maiawali made excellent stockmen, and estimated that their numbers were still around 500, though rapidly diminishing due, in his view, to the devastating impact of venereal disease, opium smoking, tobacco, and what, regarding the males, Charles Sturt called "the terrible rite" (subincision), and among the females of introcision.

Native title
The descendants of the Maiawali and Karuwali underwrote an agreement regarding mining rights in the area south west of Winton covering .

Alternative names
 Maiali.
 Majawali.
 Mailly.
 Myall, Myallee.
 Myoli.
 Miorli.
 Majuli (error)
 Puruga. (lit.penis people, an exonym reflecting their adoption of circumcision).

Notes

Citations

Sources

Aboriginal peoples of Queensland